Dilhan Cooray (born 10 March 1987) is a Sri Lankan cricketer. He made his first-class debut for Badureliya Sports Club in the 2006–07 Premier Trophy on 12 January 2007. In April 2018, he was named in Colombo's squad for the 2018 Super Provincial One Day Tournament.

On 28 March 2021, in the 2020–21 Major Clubs Limited Over Tournament match between Sri Lanka Army Sports Club and Bloomfield Cricket and Athletic Club, Army Sports Club's captain Thisara Perera hit six sixes in one over off Cooray's bowling.

References

External links
 

1987 births
Living people
Sri Lankan cricketers
Badureliya Sports Club cricketers
Bloomfield Cricket and Athletic Club cricketers
Burgher Recreation Club cricketers
Galle District cricketers
Tamil Union Cricket and Athletic Club cricketers
Cricketers from Colombo